BIMB Holdings Berhad is an investment holding company based in Kuala Lumpur, Malaysia. It is owned by the state-owned enterprise, Tabung Haji.

Subsidiaries
Bank Islam Malaysia Berhad
Takaful Malaysia Berhad
BIMB Securities

External links

 
Holding companies of Malaysia
Government-owned companies of Malaysia
Companies listed on Bursa Malaysia
1997 establishments in Malaysia
Financial services companies established in 1997
Tabung Haji